Elena Romanovna (?-1243), was a Grand Princess of the Kiev by marriage (m. 1210 or 1211) to Michael of Chernigov, Grand Prince of Kiev (r. 1236–1240, 1240, 1241–1243).  

Elena Romanovna (or Maria Romanovna) was a daughter of prince Roman Mstislavich of Halych and his wife, Predslava Rurikovna of Kiev

Issue
The existence of the last four children in the list below is disputed.

Feodula Mikhailovna (1212 – 1250); became a nun and adopted the religious name Evfrosinia;
Duke Rostislav Mikhailovich of Macsó (b. c. 1225 – 1262);
Maria Mikhailovna (? – 7 or 9 December 1271), wife of Prince Vasilko Konstantinovich of Rostov;
Prince Roman Mikhailovich of Chernigov and Bryansk (c. 1218 – after 1288/1305);
Prince Mstislav Mikhailovich of Karachev and Zvenigorod (1220 – 1280);
Prince Simeon Mikhailovich of Glukhov and Novosil;
Prince Yury Mikhailovich of Torusa and Bryansk.

References

Year of birth unknown
Date of death unknown
1243 deaths
Kievan Rus' princesses
13th-century Rus' women